The Massachusetts Institute for a New Commonwealth, or "MassINC," is registered as a non-profit 501(c) organization that functions as a nonpartisan, evidence-based think tank. Its mission is to develop a public agenda for Massachusetts that promotes the growth and vitality of the middle class. Its governing philosophy is rooted in the ideals embodied in the American Dream: equality of opportunity, personal responsibility, and a strong commonwealth. Their mission is to promote a public agenda for the middle class and to help all citizens achieve the American dream.

Activity 

MassINC was founded in 1996 by Tripp Jones and Michael Gritton who, together with a small group of leaders from the civic, business and policy-making fields, believed that the policy process in Massachusetts was missing accurate, thorough and unbiased information and research about the challenges facing the middle class. The organization was built around the conviction that better outcomes would be achieved if policy makers and opinion leaders were armed with credible data and analysis about key issues surrounding quality of life in Massachusetts. Credible, unbiased, fact-based analysis have thus been cornerstones of the MassINC strategy and have made it an organization of record for policy analysis and civic engagement.

The Massachusetts Cape Wind Project took on national prominence as a symbol of the United States' efforts to embrace renewable energy, reduce reliance on fossil fuels, and combat climate change. But locally, the project's above-market cost became a hot-button issue, prompting a debate about green industry in general and the best way for Massachusetts to achieve its environmental and energy goals without putting businesses at a competitive disadvantage. In 2010, Greg Torres, President of MassINC and publisher of CommonWealth magazine, Bruce Mohl, editor of CommonWealth and WBUR health and science reporter Sacha Pfeiffer moderated a debate between gubernatorial candidates Charlie Baker and Deval Patrick.

Criminal Justice Reform Coalition 
The Massachusetts Criminal Justice Reform Coalition is a group of civic leaders who believe there is an urgent need for comprehensive corrections reform. The Coalition supports law enforcement, county sheriffs, the judiciary, agency officials, and legislative leaders working to advance comprehensive change across the criminal justice system. MassINC provides staffing and organizational support for the Coalition.

In 2013, The Massachusetts Criminal Justice Reform Coalition released its first report, Crime, Cost, and Consequences: Is It Time to Get Smart on Crime? The 40-page report outlines the costs of the state's incarceration system and presents reforms to both curb those costs and improve public safety. Among the recommendations are:  
  
Placing a moratorium on state and county prison expansion;
Revisiting the state's approach to sentencing and sanctions;
Expand the use of community supervision and pre-release; and
Review current conditions of confinement, programming, and program quality across the system.

Since 2014, MassINC has collaborated with Community Resources for Justice and the Massachusetts Bar Association to host panels and forums on the matter of criminal justice reform.

In 2014, the group hosted a presentation and panel discussion entitled "Reform, Re-entry and Results: Change and Progress in the Massachusetts Criminal Justice System." The event featured remarks from Gov. Deval L. Patrick, who announced a program that aims to reduce recidivism by prison inmates by 50 percent during the next five years. The governor called for the reinstatement of the Sentencing Commission, the limited use of restraints on mentally ill inmates in state prisons to only those that pose "serious and immediate" danger, and the abolishment of the use of restraints on pregnant inmates during labor. He then highlighted the importance of re-entry programs, stating that 97 percent of those incarcerated will return to Massachusetts communities after serving time in prison. He also introduced a "step down" program in which state prison inmates would be transferred back into society through county correctional facilities before their release. Patrick also stressed the prevention and treatment of substance abuse as primarily a health problem.
The second annual event in 2015 highlighted the state's judicial branch with a focus on state and federal sentencing practices and reforms. In a keynote address, Supreme Judicial Court Chief Justice Ralph D. Gants called for an end to mandatory minimum sentences in drug cases, noting that mandatory minimum sentences for drug offenses are unfair to minority groups, fail to address the drug epidemic and are a poor investment of public funds. The program also included a presentation of new research from Bruce Western, Guggenheim Professor of Criminal Justice Policy at Harvard University, and two panel discussions: "High-Performing Sentencing Commissions" and "Justice for Special Populations." The summit wrapped up with closing remarks from Attorney General Maura Healey.
The theme of the third annual event was the role of cross-agency partnerships within the criminal justice community, focusing on serving individuals with behavioral health conditions, integrating information systems to enable data-driven decision-making and facilitating successful reentry. The keynote speakers were Hampden County Sheriff Michael Ashe and Essex County Sheriff Frank Cousins. Two of the longest serving sheriffs in Massachusetts, Ashe and Cousins each provided their perspectives on effective cross-agency partnerships.

MassINC Polling Group 
The MassINC Polling Group is a full-service opinion research company serving public, private, and social sector organizations. The MassINC Polling Group started in Boston with a local and state-level focus and now serves a national client base. Although it has expanded its reach, the group still conducts and releases more public opinion research on Massachusetts than any other polling organization. The president, Steve Koczela, has written extensively on public opinion and data analysis for both media and academic publications.

In 2015, the MassINC Polling Group conducted a poll to gauge Boston area support for hosting the 2024 Summer Olympics. A March 2015 poll indicated that 52% of Boston area residents were opposed to hosting the Olympic Games. On July 27, 2015, the USOC dropped its bid to host the Olympics in Boston citing the lack of public support and uncertainties in the bid.
Throughout 2014, MassINC Polling Group followed the Massachusetts gubernatorial election, 2014 and the United States Senate election in Massachusetts, 2014 with a series of polls. These polls were extensively cited by publications such as The Huffington Post, Politico, and WBUR-FM.
During the Republican Party presidential primaries, 2016 and Democratic Party presidential primaries, 2016, MassINC Polling Group conducted surveys to gauge support for each candidate.

Gateway Cities Innovation Institute 
In October 2012, MassINC formed the Gateway Cities Innovation Institute to empower local leaders with research, data, leadership development, and technical assistance to make Gateway Cities and their residents stronger contributors to the Commonwealth’s regional economies. The institute is a think tank that envisions Massachusetts gateway cities (former manufacturing cities) driving regional economies. The Gateway City designation was created in a 2007 MassINC-Brookings Institution report to identify a group of the Massachusetts' traditional manufacturing cities that were missing out on a knowledge-driven economy. In particular, MassINC claims its work benefits Lawrence, New Bedford, Worcester, and Springfield.

The Gateway Cities Education Vision Project was the first major initiative of the Gateway Cities Innovation Institute. MassINC has been meeting with Gateway City mayors and superintendents to discuss opportunities to collaborate on education issues since early 2012. These conversations led to consensus that a facilitated process was needed to develop a clear vision for how Gateway Cities could develop cross-sector initiatives to build 21st century education systems that support student success from cradle to career. Through this partnership, the Gateway Cities Innovation Institute will ensure the Gateway Cities education agenda benefits from evidence of best practice and in-depth analysis by researchers.

CommonWealth 

CommonWealth is a web-based publication that covers politics, policy, ideas, and civic life, with an emphasis on investigative reporting, in-depth analysis, and political mapping. The publication is a non-profit enterprise that is funded by corporate sponsors, philanthropists, foundations, advertisers, and supporters who thirst for more coverage of public policy. Two of the largest sponsors are the John S. and James L. Knight Foundation and The Boston Foundation. CommonWealth is published by MassINC. The magazine initially operated a print edition, but this ceased publication in 2018.

Staff

Publisher
Lauren Louison Grogan

Editors
Bruce Mohl
Michael Jonas

Reporters
Sarah Betancourt
Shira Schoenberg

Contributing authors
Colman M. Herman

References 

Political and economic think tanks in the United States
1995 establishments in Massachusetts
Think tanks
Non-profit organizations based in Boston
Non-profit organizations based in Massachusetts
Organizations based in Boston
Think tanks based in the United States